Dhavani Kanavugal is a 1984 Indian Tamil-language film written, directed and produced by K. Bhagyaraj, starring Sivaji Ganesan and Bhagyaraj. The film was dubbed in Telugu as Ammaayiluu... Preminchandi!

Plot 
This story revolves around an unemployed youngster who tries to become rich for his big family. Bhagyaraj is an unemployed gold medallist with five younger sisters, and a mother. He is unable to find a job in spite of his education, and is supported by his sisters, and his house-owner played by Sivaji Ganesan. After many failures, he goes to Chennai in search of job, and meets Radhika. The rest of the film is about how he succeeds in life and what he ends up with. The best part of the screenplay is its ability to portray many of the existing social conditions in the society, including unemployment of educated youth and dowry.

Cast 
 Bhagyaraj as Subramani
 Raadhika as Subramani's love interest
 Sivaji Ganesan as Captain Chidambaram/Nethaji Subhash Chandra Bose
 Ilavarasi
Uma Bharani as Subramani's sister
 Nithya as Subramani's sister
 Kokila as Subramani's sister
 Babitha as Subramani's sister
 Priyadarshini as Subramani's sister
 Poornima Rao as Bharathiraja's sister
 C. R. Parthiban (as Father of a bridegroom)
 Parthiban as Postman Ponnusami
 Mayilsamy as Crowd
 Bharathiraja as himself (Guest Appearance)
 Radha (Special Appearance)
 Chitra Lakshmanan as assistant director to Bharathiraja (Guest Appearance)
 Dubbing Janaki as Subramani's mother
 Urvashi as actress

Soundtrack 
The music was composed by Ilaiyaraaja. The song "Sengamalam Sirikkudhu" is based on Lalitha raga. The song "Oru Nayagan" was remixed by Premgi Amaren in Thozha (2008).

References

External links 
 

1980s Tamil-language films
1984 drama films
1984 films
Films directed by K. Bhagyaraj
Films scored by Ilaiyaraaja
Indian drama films